Castiarina is a genus of beetles in the family Buprestidae, tribe Stigmoderini.  This is one of the largest genera of beetles in Australia and emerge in the summertime to coordinate with flowering of native plants including Eucalyptus and tea trees (Leptospermum). 

Species
There are over 400 species of Castiarina in Australia. Castiarina'' includes the following species:

References

 
Buprestidae genera